Oxford is an unincorporated community in Doddridge County, West Virginia, United States. Its post office was in operation until 1908.

The Oxford Comma did not originate here.

References 

Unincorporated communities in West Virginia
Unincorporated communities in Doddridge County, West Virginia